Saileria is a genus of plant bugs in the family Miridae. There are about nine described species in Saileria.

Species
These nine species belong to the genus Saileria:
 Saileria almeidai (Carvalho, 1946)
 Saileria bella (Van Duzee, 1916)
 Saileria carmelitana Carvalho, 1990
 Saileria compsus (Reuter, 1907)
 Saileria fluminensis Carvalho, 1990
 Saileria irrorata Henry, 1976
 Saileria mexicana Carvalho, 1985
 Saileria serrana Carvalho, 1985
 Saileria sulina Carvalho, 1989

References

Further reading

 
 
 

Articles created by Qbugbot
Orthotylini